James Bowen, known professionally as Droid Bishop, is an Australian synthwave artist, guitarist, keyboardist and songwriter.
Bowen is the brother of musician Sam Sparro.

Discography
Electric Love (2013)
The Irrelevance of Space & Time (2013)
Beyond The Blue (2014)
In Your Love (2015)                                                                                       
Lost in Symmetry (2016)
End of Aquarius (2017)                                                                                                                  
Rebirth of the Machine (2019)
Music (2020)
Into the Abstract (2021)
Nights (2022)

References

External links

Beyond Synth interview

D
Living people
Electro musicians
Australian keyboardists
Australian film score composers
1985 births